Kalocsa is a district in western part of Bács-Kiskun County. Kalocsa is also the name of the town where the district seat is found. The district is located in the Southern Great Plain Statistical Region.

Geography 
Kalocsa District borders with Kunszentmiklós District to the north, Kiskőrös District to the east, Jánoshalma District to the southeast, Baja District to the south, Tolna District and Paks District (Tolna County) to the west. The number of the inhabited places in Kalocsa District is 21.

Municipalities 
The district has 3 towns, 2 large villages and 16 villages.
(ordered by population, as of 1 January 2013)

The bolded municipalities are cities, italics municipalities are large villages.

Demographics

In 2011, it had a population of 52,497 and the population density was 49/km².

Ethnicity
Besides Hungarian majority, the main minorities are the German (approx. 3,000), Roma (1,800), Croat (1,000), Slovak and Romanian (100).

Total population (2011 census): 52,497
Ethnic groups (2011 census): Identified themselves: 51,084 persons:
Hungarians: 44,689 (87.48%)
Germans: 2,951 (5.78%)
Gypsies: 1,801 (3.53%)
Croats: 1,005 (1.97%)
Others and indefinable: 638 (1.25%)
Approx. 1,500 persons in Kalocsa District did not declare their ethnic group at the 2011 census.

Religion
Religious adherence in the county according to 2011 census:

Catholic – 25,901 (Roman Catholic – 25,773; Greek Catholic – 121);
Reformed – 5,957;
Evangelical – 1,299;
other religions – 639; 
Non-religious – 5,484; 
Atheism – 379;
Undeclared – 12,838.

Gallery

See also
List of cities and towns of Hungary

References

External links
 Postal codes of the Kalocsa District

Districts in Bács-Kiskun County